Superman: Red Son is a 2020 American animated superhero film focusing on the DC Comics character Superman, and the 37th film of the DC Universe Animated Original Movies. The film is based on the 2003 comic book miniseries of the same name written by Mark Millar and pencilled by Dave Johnson, Andrew Robinson, Walden Wong and Killian Plunkett. It was released digitally on February 25, 2020 and was released on Ultra HD Blu-ray and Blu-ray on March 17. This was the final film of Jim Ward before his retirement in 2021.

Plot
In the Soviet Union in 1946, a young boy is chased by a gang of bullies. A young girl, Svetlana, defends him by chasing them away. He reveals to her that he was not scared for his own safety, but that of the bullies before demonstrating superhuman strength and the ability to fly. Svetlana tells the boy he should use his powers to help his country.

A decade later, in 1955, the Soviet government releases a propaganda film of an alien superhuman under the command of Joseph Stalin, whom the American media dubs the "Soviet Superman". U.S. President Dwight D. Eisenhower tasks Lex Luthor to develop a countermeasure against him. Meanwhile, Superman prevents a satellite from crashing into Metropolis (something that Luthor had planned), which leads to Lex's wife, Lois Lane, securing an interview with him. She shows him a top-secret document that leads Superman to a secret gulag (that was shielded by lead). There he meets a young boy surrounded by bats, and a dying Svetlana, who was imprisoned there by Stalin because she knew his real identity. Enraged, Superman confronts and kills Stalin. As a result, he becomes the new leader of the Soviet Union, pledging to use his powers for good and to spread the influence of the Soviet state.

Superman advances communist ideals across the world, ending the Korean War and demolishing the Berlin Wall, which the Western powers built to deter him. He also forges an alliance and close friendship with Princess Diana / Wonder Woman of Themyscira. Meanwhile, Luthor unveils a clone of Superman, dubbed "Superior Man", who is sent to confront Superman. The two superhumans battle until Luthor overloads the clone with excess energy, causing it to degenerate as the fight progresses until it finally collapses and dissolves. Superman is left appalled by Luthor's actions.

In 1967, Superman stops an invasion by the alien cyborg Brainiac, reprogramming him to become his advisor, and uses his technology to advance the countries of the Warsaw Pact, as well as lobotomize Soviet dissidents. However, he is unable to prevent Brainiac from shrinking the city of Stalingrad before defeating him, and is also forced to deal with the terrorist Batman, a survivor of the secret gulag who blames Superman for his family's death. Batman kidnaps Wonder Woman and binds her with the Lasso of Truth to lead Superman into a trap, using lamps that simulate Krypton's red sun to neutralize his powers. Batman beats Superman and leaves him to die until Wonder Woman breaks free and destroys the lamps' power source, restoring Superman's powers. When Superman threatens to lobotomize him, Batman chooses to commit suicide. Drained from freeing herself, Wonder Woman leaves Superman, disillusioned by man's brutality.

In the United States, Luthor is elected President and ushers in a new age of prosperity that threatens Soviet dominance. Finding Abin Sur's crashed spaceship and body, Luthor tasks Colonel Hal Jordan with uncovering the immense power of the green ring found on the alien's body, leading to the formation of the Green Lantern Corps. In 1983, Jordan leads an attack against Superman, which is briefly halted by Wonder Woman, who tries one last time to end the conflict before announcing that Themyscira will be closed to all men forever. With Brainiac's encouragement, Superman sets out to confront Luthor at the White House, only to find Lois with the bottled city of Stalingrad. Superman tells her that for years he has tried and failed to reverse the miniaturization of the city, but Brainiac reveals that the technology has always been available to him; he just chose not to mention it, and Superman gave him no order to reverse the process. Realizing the error of his ways, Superman stands down, but Brainiac destroys the shrunken city and proceeds with the attack, revealing that the reprogramming failed and he had been using Superman to conquer the planet for himself. Superman and Luthor battle Brainiac and destroy him, but his ship is set to self-destruct upon his defeat. Superman flies the ship out into deep space, apparently dying in the explosion.

At a ceremony in front of the Capitol Building, a disguised Superman watches from the crowd as Luthor announces his resignation from his Presidency to spend more time with Lois, handing over the country to Vice President James Olsen. Lois shares a brief glimpse with Superman before he disappears into the crowd.

Cast
 Jason Isaacs as Superman
 Diedrich Bader as Lex Luthor
 Amy Acker as Lois Lane
 Sasha Roiz as Hal Jordan
 Vanessa Marshall as Wonder Woman
 Phil Morris as James Olsen
 Paul Williams as Brainiac
 Phil LaMarr as John Stewart / Ron Troupe
 Jim Meskimen as Dwight D. Eisenhower / John F. Kennedy
 William Salyers as Joseph Stalin / Jack Ryder
 Roger Craig Smith as Batman
 Jason Spisak as Dimitri
 Tara Strong as Young Superman
 Travis Willingham as Superior Man / Guy Gardner / Petrovich
 Winter Ave Zoli as Svetlana
 Greg Chun as Ambassador Lee
 Jim Ward as George Taylor

Production
In 2013, Warner Bros. Animation producer James Tucker said that a Red Son film adaptation had been discussed at the studio, and that he personally would be interested in such a project. On January 8, 2019, it was announced that a direct-to-video film adaption of the comic was in development, as part of the DC Universe Animated Original Movies line.

Reception

Superman: Red Son received generally positive reviews.

Russian media reception
The presenters of the pro-Kremlin TV channel Russia-24 Alexey Kazakov and Anastasia Ivanova described the film as "Russophobic hysteria", further stating that "if Russia had not been so interesting, then there would have been no 'Red Son'." In the program Time Will Tell, the film adaptation was called an element of a serious information war against Russia, the purpose of which is to form the image of the enemy. Anatoly Kuzichev concluded: "Comics are evil. Literature only!" On the other hand, Yevgeni Popov considers this marketing without political background. According to the journalist, "we need to focus on our heroes."

Mir Fantastiki criticized the adaptation, primarily for changes in the plot compared to the comic book. Reviewer DTF [ru] noted that in the film adaptation, the atmosphere of the original was completely lost, and the main plot twist was removed from the final product. In the review of Disgusting Men, the cartoon was called very weak, having lost the main idea and depth, besides with cheap animation.

Sales
The film earned $601,592 from domestic DVD sales and $1,411,992 from domestic Blu-ray sales, bringing its total home video earning to $2,013,584.

References

External links
 
 Superman: Red Son at The World's Finest

2020 animated films
2020 direct-to-video films
2020 films
2020 science fiction action films
2020s American animated films
2020s direct-to-video animated superhero films
American alternate history films
American science fiction action films
Animated action films
Animated science fiction films
Animated Superman films
Cold War films
2020s English-language films
Films about the Berlin Wall
Films about John F. Kennedy
Films about Joseph Stalin
Cultural depictions of Dwight D. Eisenhower
Films based on works by Mark Millar
Films directed by Sam Liu
Films produced by Sam Register
Films scored by Frederik Wiedmann
Films set in Berlin
Films set in Korea
Films set in the 1950s
Films set in the Soviet Union
Films set in the United States
Films set in 1946
Films set in 1961
Films set in 1966
Films set in 1967
Films set in 1983
Korean War films
Warner Bros. Animation animated films
Warner Bros. direct-to-video animated films
Warner Bros. direct-to-video films
Films adapted into comics